Vetri (season 2) is a 2015 soap opera that aired Monday through Thursday on MediaCorp Vasantham from 22 June 2015 10 September 2015 for 47 episodes.

The show starred Jaynesh, Anand K, Eswari, Nishmen, Mahalakshimi, Thirumagal and Janani Devi among others. The show final episode aired 11 September 2015.

Plot
The story of Vetri Vel, a motivational speaker becomes a Coach who inspires and makes the students realize their potential. Most importantly he teaches them good values and morals turning average students into good, well-mannered responsible human being

Cast

 Jaynesh as Vetri
 Anand K as Mano
 Eswari as Kayalvizhi 
 Shreedhee Sajeev as Harini
 Nishmen as Varun
 Mahalakshimi as Hema
 Thirumagal as Manthra 
 Janani Devi as Vedhika 
 Mohd Amin as Jeeva
 Prasad Wadarajan as Dinesh 
 Sunthary as Vimala
 Mahesh as vijayan
 Laavenya Elangovan as Akila
 Suresh Vanaz as 
 Vickneswary Se as 
 Sri Hari as Raaghav 
 Vimala Velu
 Saranraj

Original soundtrack

Soundtrack

References

External links 
 Vasantham Official Website

2015 Tamil-language television seasons